Newell Branch is a  long 1st order tributary to Tidbury Creek in Kent County, Delaware.

Course
Newell Branch rises in a pond about 0.5 miles west of Star Hill in Kent County, Delaware on the Isaac Branch divide.  Newell Branch then flows easterly to meet Tidbury Creek at Voshell Mill, Delaware.

Watershed
Newell Branch drains  of area, receives about 44.8 in/year of precipitation, has a topographic wetness index of 604.28 and is about 1.2% forested.

See also
List of Delaware rivers

Maps

References

Rivers of Delaware
Rivers of Kent County, Delaware